Eumorpha analis is a moth of the  family Sphingidae.

Distribution 
It is known from Bolivia, Argentina, Paraguay and Brazil.

Description 
The upperside of the body and wings is similar to Eumorpha satellitia satellitia but the ground colour is darker and more olive-green. There is a conspicuous dark stripe on the head and thorax, running along the midline. There is a broad, dark edged, pale stripe on the abdomen, running along the midline. The hindwing upperside inner margin is pink.

Biology 
Adults have been recorded in March and from November to December in Bolivia and in December in Argentina.

The larvae probably feed on Vitis species.

References

Eumorpha
Moths described in 1903